William Busby may refer to:
 William Busby (priest)
 William Busby (politician)
 William S. Busby, United States Air Force general